The 2003 Generali Open was a men's tennis tournament played on outdoor clay courts at the Tennis Stadium Kitzbühel in Kitzbühel in Austria and was part of the International Series Gold of the 2003 ATP Tour. It was the 48th edition of the tournament and ran from 21 July until 27 July 2003. Guillermo Coria won the singles title.

Finals

Singles

 Guillermo Coria defeated  Nicolás Massú 6–1, 6–4, 6–2
 It was Coria's 3rd title of the year and the 4th of his career.

Doubles

 Martin Damm /  Cyril Suk defeated  Jürgen Melzer /  Alexander Peya 6–4, 6–4
 It was Damm's 3rd title of the year and the 26th of his career. It was Suk's 3rd title of the year and the 27th of his career.

References

External links
 ITF tournament edition details

Generali Open
Austrian Open Kitzbühel
2003 in Austrian tennis